Mont-Saint-Guibert is a municipality of Wallonia located in the Belgian province of Walloon Brabant. On January 1, 2012, Mont-Saint-Guibert had a total population of 7000.

In addition to Mont-Saint-Guibert itself, the municipality includes the villages of Corbais and Hévillers.

Before the owners of Stella Artois brewery bought the business, Leffe beer was brewed in the village along with Vieux Temps. The brewery was subsequently closed and production was moved to Leuven in the Flemish part of the country.

The commune is now fast developing with the arrival of many commuters who have moved from the capital city of Brussels. They are served by a local station and the nearby E411 Brussels to Luxembourg highway.

References

External links
 
Municipality of Mont-Saint-Guibert

 
Municipalities of Walloon Brabant